Harold Leon "Hal" Ebersole (September 24, 1899 – September 25, 1984) was an American football guard who played one season for the Cleveland Indians of the National Football League (NFL). He went to college at Cornell.

Hal Ebersole was born on September 24, 1899 in St. Louis, Missouri. He went to high school at Montclair Academy (since renamed as Montclair Kimberley Academy) in New Jersey. He went to college at Cornell from 1919 to 1922. Ebersole was the only Monclair Academy attendee to ever play professionally and was one of only 39 pro Cornell players. In 1923, Ebersole played one season for the Cleveland Indians, making two appearances. He also made one start. His weight was 190 pounds while his height was 6-3. Ebersole played the guard position. He died on September 25, 1984 in Atlanta, Georgia at the age of 85. It was only one day after his 85th birthday.

References

1899 births
1984 deaths
Cornell Big Red football players
Cleveland Indians (NFL 1923) players
Montclair Kimberley Academy alumni